The Walthall County School District is a public school district based in Tylertown, Mississippi (USA). The district's boundaries parallel that of Walthall County.

Schools
Tylertown High School
Tylertown Upper Elementary School
Tylertown Lower Elementary School
Tylertown Primary School
Dexter Attendance Center
Salem Attendance Center

Demographics

2006-07 school year
There were a total of 2,616 students enrolled in the Walthall County School District during the 2006–2007 school year. The gender makeup of the district was 47% female and 53% male. The racial makeup of the district was 65.02% African American, 34.21% White, 0.42% Hispanic, 0.15% Asian, and 0.19% Native American. 65.4% of the district's students were eligible to receive free lunch.

Previous school years

Accountability statistics

Racial Segregation
On April 13, 2010 the US District Court of Southern Mississippi found that the school board was in violation of a 1970 desegregation law for allowing white students at the Tylertown-based schools to transfer to Salem Academy, resulting in predominantly African American classrooms in Tylertown and White classrooms at Salem. The school board had admitted to their computer system using race as a factor in creating classroom assignments for each class of an upcoming school year.

See also
List of school districts in Mississippi

References

External links
 

Education in Walthall County, Mississippi
School districts in Mississippi